Tang Jun may refer to:

 Tang Jun (executive), president and CEO of Gaotime Information Co. Ltd
 Tang Jun (politician), Communist Party Secretary of Dalian